Donald Alfred Chant  (30 September 1928 – 23 December 2007) was a Canadian entomologist, zoologist, and environmental advocate, known for his work using mites in biological control. He was elected fellow of the Royal Society of Canada and the Entomological Society of Canada. Born in Toronto, he moved to Vancouver in 1945, where he earned a BA (1950) and MA (1952) from the University of British Columbia. He received his PhD from the University of London in 1956. He was chair of the Department of Biological Control at the University of California, Riverside from 1964 to 1967, then made chair of the University of Toronto Department of Zoology, where he served as professor from 1967 to his retirement in 1993, and emeritus professor from 1993 to 2007.

References

1928 births
2007 deaths
Canadian entomologists
20th-century Canadian zoologists
Fellows of the Royal Society of Canada
Scientists from Toronto
University of British Columbia alumni
Academic staff of the University of Toronto
Officers of the Order of Canada
Presidents of the Canadian Society of Zoologists